Kévé (also Keye) is a town and canton with 12,000 residents in southwest Togo.

Between 1928 and 1930, the chief of Keve was arrested by French officials for resisting the French regime. As of 1933, Aleke was chief of the town. The town Keve is located by 50 km from Lome. The cultural celebration of this region is Avezan or Aveza. They plant oil palms in their region cause they produce red oil and palm wine.

References

Populated places in Maritime Region
Cantons of Togo